The Rudi River, or Rudi Khola is a river in Nepal, a left tributary of the Madi River.

Hydrology

The others are the Midim, Paste, Birdi, Khalte, Pisti, Risti, Sange and Kalesti.
The river's discharge is highest between mid-April and mid-December, when there is most rain, with less water from mid-December to mid-April.

In July 1951 there was heavy rain in the area which caused landslide and flood in the Rudi khola.
About  of khet land (irrigated lowland) was damaged, and large areas were yet to be reclaimed in 2004.
In July 2018 flooding caused serious damage to the Rudi Khola A hydropower project, which was under construction.
The penstock pipe was destroyed and the recently completed road was badly damaged.

Crossings

The Gurung Heritage Trail crosses the Rudi Khola on a swing bridge in the section from Pakhrikot to Bagicha.
On 27 July 2017 a bus travelling from Pokhara to Beluwabesi, Kaski District was crossing the river at Madhya on the border between Lamjung and Kaski district when the old and poorly maintained bridge collapsed.
The bus fell into the river, and several passengers suffered serious injuries or death.

Hydroelectricity

There are two run-of-the-river hydroelectricity plants on the river operated by Bindhyabasini Hydropower Development Company Limited (BHDCL).
The 8.8 MW Rudi Khola-A is in Mijuredanda VDC of Kaski District.
The 6.6 MW Rudi Khola-B is just upstream in Pasguan VDC, Lamjung District.
The variable rainfall means the power supply varies seasonally.

Notes

Sources

Rivers of Gandaki Province